HD 130603 is a double star in the northern constellation of Boötes. As of 2010.476, the components have an angular separation of 2.06″ along a position angle of 54.7°.

References

External links
 HR 5524
 CCDM J14484+2422
 Image HD 130603

Boötes
130603
Double stars
072412
F-type main-sequence stars
5524
Durchmusterung objects